The Cuckoo's Calling is a 2013 crime fiction novel by J. K. Rowling, published under the pseudonym Robert Galbraith. It is the first novel in the Cormoran Strike series of detective novels and was followed by The Silkworm in 2014, Career of Evil in 2015, Lethal White in 2018, Troubled Blood in 2020 and The Ink Black Heart in 2022.

Plot
Disabled Afghan War veteran and struggling private investigator Cormoran Strike is approached by John Bristow, the adoptive brother of Strike's childhood schoolmate Charlie. Bristow believes his supermodel sister Lula Landry, who his parents adopted after Charlie died, did not jump to her death three months earlier and wants Strike to investigate further. Although initially unconvinced, Strike takes on the case due to his need for money to repay a loan that he had been given by his biological father, rock star Johnny Rokeby, because Rokeby's lawyer is demanding repayment. As the investigation commences, Strike meets Robin Ellacott, who has been assigned by a temp agency to act as his secretary, and hires her for a week despite his lack of funds. Robin, who has just become engaged to long-time boyfriend Matthew, turns out to be much more competent than Strike expected, prompting him to extend her stay.

The two set about interviewing Lula's friends and family members, as well as her personal driver, the doorman at her Mayfair flat, and a fashion designer who affectionately called her "Cuckoo". With each recollection of Lula and the day of her death, Strike gradually suspects the circumstances of her death are murkier than he initially imagined. His suspicions are confirmed after interviewing Lula's downstairs neighbour Tansy Bestigui, who told police that she heard Lula fighting with a man shortly before her death. Although the police had dismissed Tansy's statement because she could not have heard a fight through her flat's triple glazed windows, Strike deduces that she had been locked out on the balcony by her husband following a heated argument over her cocaine use and, after telling him what she saw, had been threatened into lying that she was inside when she heard the argument.

Shortly afterward, Lula's friend Rochelle is found dead, in the Thames, drowned hours after leaving a meeting with Strike. He becomes convinced that she was in contact with the killer and later deduces that Lula, who took an interest in investigating her biological roots before her death, was murdered for the ten million pounds she stood to inherit upon her adoptive mother's death.

Strike later meets with Bristow in his office, accusing Bristow of killing Lula and Rochelle, as well as Charlie, whom everyone believed died after riding his bicycle into a quarry. Bristow was both enraged that Lula had tracked down her biological brother, Jonah, and jealous of her success. He murdered her for the same reason he murdered Charlie, which was to secure his own position, and then used Strike in an attempt to frame Jonah for the crime. Strike goes on to explain that Lula made a will that left her estate to Jonah and cut the Bristow family out entirely, which Bristow suspected. Bristow organised a plan to frame Jonah, which would make him unable to inherit, and used Strike's friendship with Charlie to achieve his endgame. Rochelle knew what had happened and was blackmailing Bristow over it, leading to her murder too. Realising he has been caught, Bristow tries to stab Strike, only to be subdued after Robin enters the office.

Some time later, Robin is preparing to leave for a new permanent job when Strike gives her a parting gift in the form of an expensive dress that she tried on during the investigation. Despite Strike being barely able to pay her and having difficulty in suppressing his romantic feelings for her, the two come to an arrangement for her to stay on.

Characters

Major characters 

Cormoran Strike is a struggling private investigator. He has few clients, a large debt, and is obliged by a recent break-up to sleep in his office on Denmark Street. He lost his leg in the Afghan war.
 Robin Ellacott is Strike's temporary secretary. She has recently moved from Yorkshire with her boyfriend and becomes engaged the night before the novel begins. She is enthusiastic about detective work, is very intelligent, competent and resourceful. She reveals a number of surprising talents as the story unfolds.
 Lula Landry (Lula Bristow), a model who died in a fall three months prior to the events of the novel. The object of Strike's investigation is to determine how Lula died.
 John Bristow is Strike's client and Lula's adoptive brother.
 Charlie Bristow is John Bristow's brother and a boyhood friend of Strike's. Charlie died when he fell into a quarry when he was around nine or ten years old. Charlie was about six years older than Lula Landry (Bristow).
 Alison Cresswell is in a relationship with John Bristow. She works as a secretary for Tony Landry and Cyprian May in their legal practice.
 Tony Landry is Lula and John's maternal uncle. He disapproved of Lula's lifestyle, and raised objections to Lula's adoption in the first instance. He has a difficult relationship with his sister.
 Lady Yvette Bristow is Lula and John's adopted mother. She is terminally ill during the events of the novel and her relations with Lula were strained.
 Sir Alec Bristow is Lady Bristow's late husband. He founded his own electronics company, Albris. Sir Alec was sterile and could not have children of his own. He and Lady Bristow adopted three children: John, Charlie, and Lula Bristow. Lula was adopted when she was four years old, shortly after Charlie's death. Sir Alec died suddenly from a heart attack.
 Cyprian May is a senior partner at the law firm where John Bristow works.
 Ursula May (Chillingham) is Tansy Bestigui's sister and Cyprian May's wife.

Lula's social circle 
 Evan Duffield is Lula's on-off boyfriend, an actor with documented drug problems. He was the initial suspect in the media at the time of Lula's death, but has numerous witnesses to an alibi. He argued with Lula before her death.
 Rochelle Onifade is a homeless friend of Lula's, whom she had known since her teenage years in an outpatient clinic.
 Guy Somé (Kevin Owusu)  is a fashion designer, and had a close (though platonic) relationship with Lula. He is the one who calls her 'Cuckoo'. He was in Tokyo in the week leading up to her death and is an astute character witness.
 Deeby Macc is an American rapper who was supposed to arrive to stay in the apartment below Lula's in Kentigern Gardens on the night of her death.
 Kieran Kolovas-Jones is Lula's personal driver who has aspirations of fame as an actor.
 Ciara Porter is a model, and a friend of Lula's.
 Freddie Bestigui is a film producer and neighbour of Lula's. He is difficult to contact and has a reputation for being difficult and abusive. He and his wife Tansy are in the process of a divorce.
 Tansy Bestigui (Chillingham) is Freddie's wife and a key witness, claiming to have overheard some of the events on the night of Lula's death. Her plausibility is an issue for the police, and initially for Strike. She is the sister of Ursula May.
 Bryony Radford is Lula's personal makeup artist and one of the people she meets on the day of her death.

Lula's biological family 
 Marlene Higson is Lula's biological mother. She sells her story to the press at every opportunity and lives in much poorer circumstances than Lula's adoptive family. She had two sons after giving birth to Lula, but Lula was not interested in helping Marlene find them. Both were taken away by social services.
 Dr Joseph 'Joe' Agyeman, Lula's biological father. He met Marlene Higson as a student. Later an academic, specialising in African and Ghanaian politics. He died five years before the events of the novel.
 Jonah Agyeman is Lula's biological half-brother, serving in the British Army in Afghanistan.

Cormoran and Robin's friends and family 
 Lucy Strike is Cormoran Strike's younger half-sister, Strike attends her son's birthday party during the novel. Strike describes her as judgmental, and craving a desire for suburban stability. He admits to being fonder of her than almost anyone else, though their relationship is often strained.
 Jonny Rokeby is Strike's famous pop-star father and has only met him twice in his lifetime.
 Leda Strike is Strike's mother, a 'supergroupie' of Jonny Rokeby's. Although a habitual drug user, she died of a heroin overdose (a drug she had not previously used) when Strike was 20. He has always suspected his stepfather had something to do with her death, though few agree with him.
 Charlotte Campbell is Strike's long-time, rich and mercurial fiancée, from whom he finally splits as the novel starts.
 Matthew Cunliffe is Robin's fiancé and works as an accountant. He proposes to Robin at the beginning of the novel. He does not approve of her working for Strike, whom he initially considers to be a shady character. He is described as being tall and 'conventionally good looking'.

Other characters 
 Eric Wardle is a detective sergeant who handles Lula Landry’s death.
 Roy Carver is a detective inspector who handles Lula Landry’s death.  He is Wardle’s superior.

Development

Background
Over the years, Rowling often spoke of writing a crime novel. In 2007, during the Edinburgh Book Festival, author Ian Rankin claimed that his wife spotted Rowling "scribbling away" at a detective novel in a cafe. Rankin later retracted the story, claiming it was a joke. The rumour persisted with The Guardian'''s speculating in 2012 that Rowling's next book would be a crime novel.

Publication
The BBC reported that Rowling sent the manuscript to the publishers anonymously, and at least one publishing house declined it, including Orion Books. It was eventually accepted by Sphere Books, which is an imprint of Little, Brown & Company, with whom Rowling had collaborated on her previous novel, The Casual Vacancy (2012).

Identification
Rowling's authorship was revealed by The Sunday Times on 13 July 2013 after it investigated how a first-time author "with a background in the army and the civilian security industry" could write such an assured debut novel. The Sunday Times enlisted the services of Oxford University's professor Peter Millican and Pittsburgh's Duquesne University professor Patrick Juola, whose software programs ran multiple analyses of the novel and other Rowling works, comparing them with the works of other authors. However, it was later reported that Rowling's authorship had been leaked to a Sunday Times reporter via Twitter by the friend of the wife of a lawyer at Russells Solicitors, who had worked for Rowling. The firm subsequently apologised and made a "substantial charitable donation" to the Soldiers' Charity as a result of legal action brought by Rowling. 

After being revealed as the author, Rowling said she would have liked to remain anonymous for a while longer, stating: "Being Robert Galbraith has been such a liberating experience... It has been wonderful to publish without hype and expectation and pure pleasure to get feedback under a different name."

Editions
The first printing of the first UK edition ran to at least 1,500 copies, with a cover that features a quote from Val McDermid, while the back cover has quotes from Mark Billingham and Alex Gray. All three are fellow crime novelists, who deny having been told Galbraith's true identity. It was stated on the book's dust jacket that 'Robert Galbraith' was a pseudonym, but the adjoining biographical details provided about Galbraith's time with the Royal Military Police suggested that the pseudonym was employed simply to protect the identity of a government official, somewhat in the manner of John le Carré.

The copyright page does not have a number line but simply states, 'First published in Great Britain in 2013 by Sphere'. The copyright page of the second printings of the first UK edition does not have a number line either, but in addition to the 'first published' line quoted above has a second line stating 'Reprinted 2013 (twice)'. (Trade paperback editions and hardbacks share the same imprint page, and this page lists the number of reprints; it is updated each time there is a reprint. In this case, the trade paperback reprinted prior to the hardback.) The reprint also features an amended back cover with additional quotes, while the revised inside flaps now acknowledge Rowling's authorship.

Sales and reception
Before Rowling's identity as the book's author was revealed, 1,500 copies of the printed book had been sold since its release in April 2013, plus another 7,000 copies of the ebook, audiobook, and library editions. The book surged from 4,709th to the best-selling novel on Amazon after it was revealed on 14 July 2013 that the book was written by Rowling under the pseudonym "Robert Galbraith". Signed copies of the first edition are selling for $US4,000–6,000.

The book received mostly positive reviews. Most of them came only after Rowling became known as the author, but the early reactions were generally complimentary as well. After the revelation of the author's identity, Declan Burke of The Irish Times gave a very positive review, particularly enjoying its "satisfyingly complex plot that winds through the labyrinth of London's vulgar rich" as well as its characterization, and deeming it to be "easily one of the most assured and fascinating debut crime novels of the year." Writing for USA Today, Charles Finch echoed this sentiment, also writing: "In both its broad strokes and in dozens of flairs of perception like this one, The Cuckoo's Calling shows that all great fiction—even if it only concerns our workaday world—has its own kind of magic." Slate's Katy Waldman also reacted favourably to the book, lauding its narration and characters and drawing parallels between the book and the Harry Potter series.

In The Plain Dealer, Laura DeMarco hailed Rowling for "fully flesh[ing] out her cast", elaborating: "It's a testament to Rowling's skillful way of imbuing humanity to her characters that although Lula is killed months before the story starts, she comes to life a flesh-and-blood woman in the way many fictional crime victims do not." Publishers Weekly and Michiko Kakutani of The New York Times concurred, with the latter opining: "Strike and his now-permanent assistant, Robin (playing Robin to his Batman, Nora to his Nick, Salander to his Blomkvist), have become a team—a team whose further adventures the reader cannot wait to read." Another positive review came from The Huffington Post, whose David Kudler praised the book as a "taut, well-written mystery that does a wonderful job of reviving an all-but-dead genre" but considered the psychology behind the crime "a bit of a stretch." The Hindustan Times also enjoyed the book, calling it "an entertaining story with characters who hold the reader's interest" but one noted that the conclusions drawn seemed "a little too out-of-nowhere." Jake Kerridge, in his The Daily Telegraph review, awarded the book four stars out of five and summed up the novel as "a sharply contemporary novel full of old-fashioned virtues; there is room for improvement in terms of construction, but it is wonderfully fresh and funny."

Thom Geier of Entertainment Weekly gave the book a "B+" and wrote: "Despite the contemporary milieu and sprinkling of F-words, The Cuckoo's Calling is decidedly old-fashioned. Rowling serves up a sushi platter of red herring, sprinkling clues along the way, before Strike draws a confession out of the killer in a climax straight out of Agatha Christie." London Evening Standard gave a mixed review, commending its satirical tone and classic plot, but criticising its "extraordinarily clunky, over-descriptive style that Rowling has made so much her own." A negative review came from NPR's Maureen Corrigen, who slammed the book for being a clichéd "'Mayhem Parva' school of British detective fiction" and its weak characters, writing: "the most intriguing unsolved mystery in The Cuckoo's Calling is why, in this post-Lisbeth Salander age, Rowling would choose to outfit her female lead with such meek and anachronistic feminine behavior."

Awards and honours
2013 Los Angeles Times Book Prize (Mystery/thriller), winner.

Sequels
Rowling confirmed in a statement published on her website that she "fully intends to keep writing the series", and would do so under the pseudonym. The title of the sequel, The Silkworm, and its publication date, 19 June, were announced on 17 February 2014. It saw Strike and his assistant, Robin Ellacott, investigating the disappearance of Owen Quine, a writer in possession of a damaging manuscript. A second sequel, Career of Evil, was published in 2015. The title of the third sequel, Lethal White, was announced on 14 March 2017, the book was published on 18 September 2018. A fourth sequel, Troubled Blood, was published on 15 September 2020. A fifth sequel, The Ink Black Heart, was published on 30 August 2022. 

In other media
Television

On 10 December 2014, it was announced that the novels would be adapted as Strike, a television series for BBC One, starting with The Cuckoo's Calling. Rowling will executive produce the series through her production company Brontë Film and Television, along with Neil Blair and Ruth Kenley-Letts. The three event dramas will be based on scripts by Ben Richards who will write The Cuckoo's Calling, and Tom Edge who will write The Silkworm and Career of Evil. Michael Keillor will direct The Cuckoo's Calling, Kieron Hawkes will direct The Silkworm and Charles Sturridge will direct Career of Evil''. Jackie Larkin will produce.

In September 2016, it was announced that Tom Burke was set to play Cormoran Strike in the adaptation. and in November 2016 it was announced that Holliday Grainger will star as Strike's assistant, Robin Ellacott.

The series also stars Leo Bill as John Bristow, Elarica Johnson as Lula Landry, Martin Shaw as Tony Landry, Tara Fitzgerald as Tansy Bestigui, Tezlym Senior-Sakutu as Rochelle Onifade, David Avery as Nico Kolovas-Jones, Brian Bovell as Derrick Wilson, Siân Phillips as Lady Yvette Bristow, Bronson Webb as Evan Duffield, Amber Anderson as Ciara Porter, Kadiff Kirwan as Guy Some, Kerr Logan as Matthew Cunliffe, and Killian Scott as DI Eric Wardle.

References

2013 British novels
Cormoran Strike series
Sphere Books books
British novels adapted into television shows